Mary Pat Bentel is a Los Angeles based independent film producer known for Amateur Night starring Jason Biggs, The Lie starring Joshua Leonard and Jess Weixler, The Midnight Swim starring Lindsay Burdge, Aleksa Palladino, and Jennifer Lafleur, Animals starring David Dastmalchian, and Austin Found starring Linda Cardellini and Skeet Ulrich. Bentel also produced This Close for Sundance Channel.

References 

Film producers from California
Living people
Year of birth missing (living people)
Place of birth missing (living people)
American women film producers